María Isabel Arrieta Gálvez or Maribel Arrieta (August 22, 1934 – August 31, 1989) was a Salvadoran beauty queen where she represented her country at Miss Universe 1955  in Long Beach, California. Arrieta is most known for her strong resemblance to Marilyn Monroe, leading people to dub her as "the Marilyn Monroe of El Salvador". Arrieta ultimately finished as first runner-up, losing to Hillevi Rombin, but not before taking home the title of "Miss Congeniality". She is the first Hispanic woman to become first-runner up in the Miss Universe pageant.

Early life
Born in San Salvador, El Salvador to a high-class family of Spanish descent, Arrieta went to school at "La Asunción de Santa Ana" in Santa Ana, El Salvador; a Catholic, private school for the elite. She then went to Los Angeles, California at the age of 16 before returning to El Salvador.

Arrieta is the second cousin of Roberto D'Aubuisson, founder of the right-wing party ARENA.

Miss Universe 1955
In the Miss Universe 1955 pageant, Arrieta became the first, and so far, the only, Salvadoran contestant to reach the top 5; finishing as first-runner up.
After Miss Universe, Arrieta starred in a Mexican film called "Nos veremos en el cielo" ("We'll meet in heaven"), marking the first, and the last time she appeared in a movie.

Later life
Arrieta returned to El Salvador in 1956, where the President at the time, Óscar Osorio made her the Ambassador to Belgium. 

While at Belgium, Arrieta met Baron Jacques Thuret (of Belgian/French nobility) and they were married in 1963, granting her the title "Baronesa de Thuret". The couple had 3 children; two boys (Henry Francois and Tanguy) and one girl (Ariane). Arrieta then began focusing on her artwork, which was showcased in various cities in Europe.

Arrieta was one of the judges in Miss Universe 1975, when the organization was invited by the Salvadoran Government.

In her last visit to her home country in 1985, Arrieta was awarded the "Orden Pro Merito Melitensi" from the Order of Malta in El Salvador for her contributions to the country. Arrieta died on August 31, 1989 from cancer.

References
Maribel Arrieta la diplomática más hermosa del mundo (Maribel Arrieta, the most beautiful dipolmat in the world)

1934 births
1989 deaths
Miss Universe 1955 contestants
People from San Salvador
Recipients of the Order pro Merito Melitensi
Salvadoran expatriates in the United States